Lake Todd is a lake in McLeod County, in the U.S. state of Minnesota.

Lake Todd was named for Daniel S. Todd, a pioneer who settled there.

References

Lakes of Minnesota
Lakes of McLeod County, Minnesota